Anna Orlova (born 23 August 1972 in Riga) is a retired Latvian luger who competed at six Winter Olympics between 1992 and 2010. She won the silver medal in the mixed team event at the 2003 FIL World Luge Championships in Sigulda, Latvia and finished fourth in the women's singles event at those same championships.

Orlova also won two medals in the mixed team event at the FIL European Luge Championships with a gold in 2010 and a bronze in 2006. She had her best individual finish in the European championships of sixth in 2010.

Her best finish at the Winter Olympics was seventh in the women's singles event at Turin in 2006. She came eleventh in the same event in 2010.

She is one of three Latvians to compete in at least six Olympic Games. The others are biathlete Ilmārs Bricis (also six Winter Olympics) and  shooter Afanasijs Kuzmins (eight summer Olympics). She is the first athlete to compete in Luge at six Olympic Games (Italian Gerda Weissensteiner competed at four Olympics in Luge and two in Bobsleigh).

See also
 List of athletes with the most appearances at Olympic Games

References
 
 Hickok sports information on World champions in luge and skeleton.
 
 Latvian Olympic Committee Profiles on the 2010 Latvian team

External links
 
 
 
 

1972 births
Latvian female lugers
Living people
Lugers at the 1992 Winter Olympics
Lugers at the 1994 Winter Olympics
Lugers at the 1998 Winter Olympics
Lugers at the 2002 Winter Olympics
Lugers at the 2006 Winter Olympics
Lugers at the 2010 Winter Olympics
Olympic lugers of Latvia
Sportspeople from Riga